Warrington Male Voice Choir is one of Great Britain's oldest choirs, tracing its formation to 1898. During its long history the choir has travelled widely and has performed in many famous concert halls and cathedrals throughout the United Kingdom, Ireland, Europe and Canada. A century of musical excellence has brought numerous festival honours including, most recently, National Champions of Great Britain, several times prize winners at the Llangollen International Eisteddfod, and premier male choir at both the Sligo and Bangor International Choral Festivals.

The choir has a full strength of ninety voices and an age range of seventy years. The choir enjoys an international reputation as one of England's foremost choirs - and as a ‘Choir for Peace’.

Following the IRA bomb attacks on Warrington town centre in 1993, the choir became involved in promoting peace and an end to violence in Northern Ireland. Links were forged with Irish peace groups and, for more than a decade, cross-community concerts for Peace and Reconciliation were performed throughout the island of Ireland, to help break down sectarian divisions. The fostering and financing of ‘grass roots’ reconciliation activities with young people in the interface areas of West Belfast contributed to the choir's initiatives being acknowledged at the highest level by the Irish, British and United States governments. In 1996 Terry Waite CBE became Patron in tribute to the choir's humanitarian role, and now frequently supports the choir's performances in British and Irish prisons, assisting rehabilitation programmes.

Harmony in Blue is the young men's section of the Warrington Male Voice Choir.  The four-part vocal group was formed in January 2008 to give greater prominence to the Male Voice Choir's younger members and to encourage the recruitment of others.  The ensemble currently comprises fourteen voices and several of the singers were former members of the Warrington Boys’ Choir during the 1990s.  The group is building a diverse repertoire representing the broad range of male choral music and complementing the rich repertoire of the full choir.

The choir and Harmony in Blue are currently directed by Russell Paterson and the assistant director is Anthony Whittaker.

External links
 Warrington Male Voice Choir

 

English choirs
1898 establishments in England
Musical groups established in 1898
Warrington